Stara Fužina is a settlement in the Municipality of Bohinj in the Upper Carniola region of Slovenia.

Church

The medieval church on the outskirts of the village is dedicated to Saint Paul.

References

External links

Stara Fužina at Geopedia

Populated places in the Municipality of Bohinj